Mustafizur Rahman (31 December 1943 – 20 October 2001) was a member of the Jatiya Sangsad for the Chittagong-3 constituency from 1991 to 1996, representing the Bangladesh Awami League.

He was the editor and publisher of the Daily Rupali. He also founded several life insurance companies, including: Karnaphuli Life Insurance Company Ltd, National Life Insurance Limited, Rupali Life Insurance Company Ltd, and Sandhani Life Insurance Ltd.

Rahman died on 20 October 2001 at Mount Elizabeth Hospital in Singapore.

Legacy
The 700-meter concrete Dwipbandhu Mustafizur Rahman Jetty at Guptachhara on the east coast of Sandwip is named in his honor. It was completed in January 2021 at a cost of Bangladeshi taka 510 million ($6M as of 2021).

References

1943 births
2001 deaths
5th Jatiya Sangsad members
7th Jatiya Sangsad members
Awami League politicians
People from Sandwip Upazila